The 1997 Oklahoma Sooners football team represented the University of Oklahoma during the 1997 NCAA Division I-A football season. They played their home games at Oklahoma Memorial Stadium and participated as members of the Big 12 Conference in the South Division. They were coached by John Blake.

Schedule

Game summaries

Texas Tech

Awards
All-Big 12: DT Kelly Gregg

1998 NFL Draft

The following Sooners were selected in the 1998 NFL draft.

References

Oklahoma
Oklahoma Sooners football seasons
Oklahoma Sooners football